Greece was represented by 6 athletes at the 1986 European Athletics Championships held in Stuttgart, West Germany.

Results

References

http://www.sansimera.gr/articles/804

1990
Nations at the 1986 European Athletics Championships
1986 in Greek sport